Nisseki-byoin-mae is a Hiroden station (tram stop) on Hiroden Ujina Line located in front of Hiroshima Red Cross Hospital & Atomic-bomb Survivors Hospital, in Senda-machi 1-chome, Naka-ku, Hiroshima.

Routes
From Nisseki-byoin-mae Station, there are three of Hiroden Streetcar routes.

 Hiroshima Station - Hiroshima Port Route
 Hiroden-nishi-hiroshima - Hiroshima Port Route
 Yokogawa Station - Hiroden-honsha-mae Route

Connections
█ Ujina Line
  
Takanobashi — Nisseki-byoin-mae — Hiroden-honsha-mae

Other services connections

Hiroshima Bus services routes
Route #21-1 and #50 at "Nisseki-mae" bus stop

Around station
Hiroshima Red Cross Hospital & Atomic-bomb Survivors Hospital
Hiroshima Red Cross Blood Center
Hiroshima University - Higashisenda Campus

History

Opened as "Kotoshihan-mae", named from "Hiroshima Kotoshihan", former Hiroshima University, on November 23, 1912.
Renamed to "Daigaku-mae", named from Hiroshima University, in 1936.
Renamed to "Hiroshima-Daigaku-mae" on February 18, 1964.
Renamed from "Hiroshima-Daigaku-mae" to present name "Nisseki-byoin-mae", named from "Hiroshima Red Cross Hospital & Atomic-bomb Survivors Hospital", on December 1, 2001.

See also
Hiroden Streetcar Lines and Routes

References

Nisseki-byoin-mae Station
Railway stations in Japan opened in 1912